Arizona mantis is a common name applied to various species of praying mantis native to Arizona, particularly:

 Pseudovates arizonae, the Arizona unicorn mantis
 Stagmomantis gracilipes, the Arizona tan mantis
 Stagmomantis limbata, the Arizona mantis or bordered mantis

See also
List of mantis genera and species

References

Mantodea by location
Mantodea of North America